Granulation tissue is new connective tissue and microscopic blood vessels that form on the surfaces of a wound during the healing process.  Granulation tissue typically grows from the base of a wound and is able to fill wounds of almost any size. Examples of granulation tissue can be seen in pyogenic granulomas and pulp polyps. Its histological appearance is characterized by proliferation of fibroblasts and new thin-walled, delicate capillaries (angiogenesis), infiltrated inflammatory cells in a loose extracellular matrix.

Appearance

During the migratory phase of wound healing, granulation tissue is:
 light red or dark pink, being perfused with new capillary loops or "buds";
 soft to the touch;
 moist;
 bumpy (granular) in appearance, due to punctate hemorrhages;
 pulsatile on palpation;
 painless when healthy;

Structure
Granulation tissue is composed of tissue matrix supporting a variety of cell types, most of which can be associated with one of the following functions:
 formation of extracellular matrix;
 operation of the immune system;
 vascularisation;

An excess of granulation tissue (caro luxurians) is informally referred to as "proud flesh".

Extracellular matrix

The extracellular matrix of granulation tissue is created and modified by fibroblasts.  Initially, it consists of a network of type-III collagen, a weaker form of the structural protein that can be produced rapidly.  This is later replaced by the stronger, long-stranded type-I collagen, as evidenced in scar tissue.

Immunity
The main immune cells active in the tissue are macrophages and neutrophils, although other leukocytes are also present.  These work to phagocytize old or damaged tissue, and protect the healing tissue from pathogenic infection.  This is necessary both to aid the healing process and to protect against invading pathogens, as the wound often does not have an effective skin barrier to act as a first line of defense.

Vascularization
It is necessary for a network of blood vessels to be established as soon as possible to provide the growing tissue with nutrients, to take away cellular wastes, and transport new leukocytes to the area.  Fibroblasts, the main cells that deposit granulation tissue, depend on oxygen to proliferate and lay down the new extracellular matrix.

In vascularisation, also called angiogenesis, endothelial cells quickly grow into the tissue from older, intact blood vessels.  These branch out in a systematic way, forming anastomoses with other vessels.

References

Anatomical pathology
Connective tissue diseases